Apatophyllum is a genus of flowering plants belonging to the family Celastraceae.

Its native range is Southwestern and Eastern Australia.

Species:

Apatophyllum constablei 
Apatophyllum flavovirens 
Apatophyllum macgillivrayi 
Apatophyllum olsenii 
Apatophyllum teretifolium

References

Celastrales genera